Sassy may refer to:

 Sassy (magazine), an American teen magazine for young women 1988–1996
 Sassy, Calvados, a commune in France
 Sassy, Inc., a baby-care products company owned by Kid Brands
 SCUBA-2 All Sky Survey (SASSy), an astronomical survey

Music
 Sassy Pandez, English DJ
 Sarah Vaughan (1924–1990), nicknamed Sassy, American jazz singer
 Sassy (album), a 1956 album by Sarah Vaughan
 Sassy, a member of the Japanese band High and Mighty Color
 "Sassy", a song by Hole from Pretty on the Inside, 1991
 "Sassy", a song by Kat Graham, 2010
 "Sassy", a song by the Manhattan Transfer from The Offbeat of Avenues, 1991
 "Sassy", a song by Rapsody from Laila's Wisdom, 2017

See also 
 SA-C (programming language) (pronounced "sassy"), a member of the C programming language family
 Sass (disambiguation)
 Sasse (disambiguation)